La Vila Olímpica del Poblenou or La Villa Olímpica (The Olympic Village of Poblenou) is a neighborhood in the Sant Martí district of Barcelona, Catalonia (Spain). It was constructed in the late 1980s and early 1990s for the 1992 Summer Olympic Games which took place in Barcelona. Its construction was devised by Oriol Bohigas, David Mackay and Albert Puigdomènec as a residential area in the otherwise industrial and working-class district of Poblenou, which underwent regeneration but involved massive expropriation, as well as the destruction of a sizeable portion of the district, including Industrial Revolution factories of architectural value such as Fàbrica Foret. It follows essentially the reticular outline of Eixample and Poblenou, with about 2000 new apartments in the area, owned by the mixed public-private company VOSA (Vila Olímpica Societat Anònima).

Education
The main campus of Universitat Pompeu Fabra is located between Parc de la Ciutadella and this neighbourhood. The buildings are former barracks which underwent restoration simultaneously with the construction of Vila Olímpica.

Architecture

The Port Olímpic de Barcelona is located in this neighborhood. The buildings in Vila Olímpica were designed by a number of winners of the FAD Award. The area includes the high rises Hotel Arts and Torre Mapfre, both of which are 154 m tall and were built in 1992.

The Torre Mapfre is located in this neighborhood, while the Hotel Arts, the Casino Barcelona and the "Peix d'Or" (goldfish), a large metal sculpture designed by Frank Gehry, are located at one edge of the Barceloneta neighborhood, close to the border with the Vila Olímpica del Poblenou.

Transport
Barcelona Metro stations Vila Olímpica and Bogatell, both on line L4.
Trambesòs tram stops Ciutadella  Vila Olímpica (connection with Barcelona Metro) and Wellington.

See also 

 Urban planning of Barcelona

Bibliography

Francesc Xavier Hernàndez i Cardona, Barcelona, història d'una ciutat. Llibres de l'Índex, Barcelona, 2001.

Neighbourhoods of Barcelona
Sant Martí (district)